Edmund Bray (1686–1725) of Barrington Park, Gloucestershire was a British politician who sat in the English House of Commons from 1701 to 1708 and in the British House of Commons from 1720 to 1722.

Bray was baptized on 7 September 1678, a younger son of Reginald Bray of Barrington Park and his wife Jane Rainton, daughter of William Rainton of Shilton, Berkshire. His father died in 1688. He married, on 16 December 1697, Frances Morgan, the daughter and eventually heiress of Sir Edward Morgan, 3rd Baronet of Llantarnam Abbey, Monmouthshire. In 1702, he succeeded his remaining elder brother William to the Great Barrington estate.

Bray was returned as a Whig Member of Parliament for Tewkesbury in the January 1701 election and retained his seat in the second general election of 1701. He was wholly inactive in the House, however, and was granted leave of absence several times over long periods. He was threatened with a challenge at Tewkesbury at the election of 1702, but successfully repelled it. He was returned unopposed again in the 1705 general election, but decided not to stand for re-election at Tewkesbury in 1708. He stood for Cirencester in 1713 but came fourth place in the poll.

Bray was returned as MP for Gloucestershire at a by-election on 22 June 1720 but did not stand at the subsequent general election of 1722.

Bray died on 6 September 1725 and was buried at Great Barrington. He and his wife had three sons and three daughters of whom two of each survived. He was succeeded by his eldest son Reginald Morgan Bray, who sold Barrington Park in 1734 to Charles Talbot, 1st Baron Talbot, the Lord Chancellor, for the use of his son William Talbot and William's wife, Mary de Cardonnel.

References 

1686 births
1725 deaths
Members of the Parliament of England for Tewkesbury
Members of the Parliament of Great Britain for Tewkesbury
Members of the Parliament of Great Britain for Gloucestershire
English MPs 1701–1702
English MPs 1702–1705
English MPs 1705–1707
British MPs 1707–1708
British MPs 1715–1722